Mount. Turnbull Western Apache - Dził Dlaazhe is the highest point in the Santa Teresa Mountains in western Graham County, Arizona. It is the highest point in the Santa Teresa Mountains and the San Carlos Apache Indian Reservation. A recreational permit is required for access to reservation land.

References 

Turnbull, Mount
Turnbull, Mount
Mountains of Graham County, Arizona